Manthan is a 1976 Indian Hindi language film.

Manthan, Manthana or Manthani also may refer to:

 Manthan Award, annual South Asian distinction

Film and television 
 Manthan: Ek Amrut Pyala, 2006 Marathi language film
 Manthana, 2007 Indian TV series
 Hindi cinema of India:
 Amrit Manthan (film), 1934 
 Manthan (1941 film)

Places
 Manthan Gowrelly, a village in Andhra Pradesh
 Manthani, an Indian municipal town in Telangana
 Manthani (Assembly constituency), Telangana
 Manthani Mutharam, an Indian municipal town in Telangana

Other 
 Samudra manthan, philosophy expressed in (Hindu epic) Mahabharata